Against Her Will: An Incident in Baltimore is a 1992 American made-for-television drama film directed by Delbert Mann and starring Walter Matthau, Harry Morgan and Susan Blakely. A sequel to The Incident (1990), it is the second of three television films featuring the characters Harmon Cobb and Judge Bell.

Plot
A small-town lawyer, Harmon Cobb, and his family move to Baltimore where he becomes the law partner of his old adversary, Judge Bell. He goes against the State of Maryland, suing on behalf of an institutionalized mental patient for release.

A sub-plot involves Cobb struggling with the death of his son in the previous film. Despite several years passing since his son's death in World War II, he finds himself unable to accept his son's widow beginning a new romance with a customer to the music shop she starts working at.

Cast
 Walter Matthau as Harmon Cobb
 Harry Morgan as Judge Stoddard Bell
 Susan Blakely as Billie
 Ariana Richards as Nancy
 Brian Kerwin as Jack Adkins
 Barton Heyman as Donald
 Norman Rose as Judge Gold
 Larry Keith as Dr. Obenland
 Michael Mantell as Dr. Friedman
 David Leary as District Attorney Yates
 Bridgit Ryan as Marika
 Susan Chapek as Melina Vovakis
 Don Brockett as Judge Mulligan
 Bingo O'Malley as Judge Stoneburner
 John Hall as Young Lawyer

References

External links 
 
 
 

1992 television films
1992 films
1992 drama films
American sequel films
1990s English-language films
Films directed by Delbert Mann
Films set in 1947
Films set in Baltimore
Television sequel films
American drama television films
1990s American films